The Free Alabama Movement is an inmates rights group based in the United States. With the Incarcerated Workers Organizing Committee, the Free Alabama Movement has organized the 2016 U.S. prison strike that involved an estimated 24,000 prisoners in 24 states, the largest prison strike in U.S. history. The strike began on September 9, 2016, the 45th anniversary of the Attica Prison uprising.

References

Advocacy groups in the United States
Prison-related organizations
Unfree labor in the United States

External links